Kepez is a municipality and district governorate in Greater Antalya, Turkey. Antalya is one of the 30 metropolitan centers in Turkey with more than one municipality within city borders. In Antalya there are five second-level municipalities in addition to the Greater Antalya (büyükşehir) municipality.

Geography 
Kepez is a part of Greater Antalya proper. The name Kepez means rocky area, referring to the local landscape prior to urbanisation, which consisted of a rocky plateau. The urban population of Kepez was 425,794  as of 2012.

History 
Kepez, like the rest of Greater Antalya, was wrested between the Seljuk Turks and the Byzantines during the 11th and 12th centuries. After 1216, Kepez was incorporated into the Seljuk realm. After the disintegration of the Seljuks, the area fell under the control of the Turkmen Beylik of Teke. In 1389, the city was captured by the Ottoman Empire. After the defeat of the Ottomans in the Battle of Ankara in 1402, Kepez was annexed by the Karamanids, another Turkmen principality, and stayed within their control until 1415. During this brief period a Turkmen tribe named Varsak was settled around Kepez. After 1415 Antalya became an Ottoman territory. During the Republican era the scattered population around Kepez increased. After Antalya was declared as the metropolitan center, the Kepez municipality was incorporated into Greater Antalya in 1993 and the corresponding district governorate was established in 2008.

Archaeology 

The ancient city of Lyrboton Kome, located in the Kepez district on a hill in Varsak, was discovered in 1910 by European archaeologists. The city was an important olive oil production center in the region and had close ties to Perge. The ancient city became a settlement during the Hellenistic era but the area grew during the era of Roman Emperor Domitian in the first century.

Kepez today 
Antalya bus terminal and a cement factory as well as a hydroelectric plant are in Kepez. Although not a seaside district, Kepez maintains a number of tourist attractions like Düden Waterfalls and the zoo of Antalya. Scenic areas, such as Kepezüstü, are also visited often. 

Kepez is a up-and-coming neighbourhood in Antalya. It is considered as a rising star and attracted investors all around the world.

Rural area
There are 6 villages in the rural area of the Kepez district. The total population of the district (urban and rural) is 433,791.

References

Populated places in Antalya Province
Kepez District
Districts of Antalya Province
Ancient Greek archaeological sites in Turkey